HD 190984 b (also known as HIP 99496 b) is an extrasolar planet which orbits the F-type main sequence star HD 190984, located approximately 330 light years away in the constellation Pavo. This planet is at least three times more massive than Jupiter and takes 13 years and four-and-a-half months to orbit the star at a semimajor axis of 5.5 AU with an eccentricity of 0.57. This planet was detected by HARPS on October 19, 2009, together with 29 other planets.

Since this is a very long-period planet detected by the radial velocity method that this planet didn't complete the orbit during the continuous observations, the error range for orbital period is very large, at 4885 ± 1600 days or 13.37 ± 4.4 years. This puts it in the range of semimajor axes between 4.2 and 6.6 AU or between 630 and 990 Gm. So this planet will need couple more years of observations to better constrain the period and semimajor axis.

See also 
 HD 5388 b
 HD 181720 b
 23 Librae c

References 

Exoplanets discovered in 2009
Exoplanets detected by radial velocity
Giant planets
Pavo (constellation)